The men's flyweight at the 1962 British Empire and Commonwealth Games as part of the boxing programme was held at the Perry Lakes Stadium from 23 to 30 November 1962.

Results

References

Boxing at the 1962 British Empire and Commonwealth Games